Robert Knowlton Beck (July 17, 1915 – January 13, 2004) was an American politician and newspaper publisher from the state of Iowa.

Beck was born in Centerville, Appanoose County, Iowa in 1915. He graduated from Centerville High School in 1933 and from Iowa Wesleyan College, as it was then known, in 1937. Beck was a veteran of World War II. Following the war, he served as a Republican for one term in the Iowa House of Representatives from January 12, 1953, to January 9, 1955. Beck was the publisher of the Centerville Daily Iowegian newspaper. Beck died in Chariton, Lucas County, Iowa on January 13, 2004. He was interred in Oakland Cemetery, Centerville, Iowa.

References

1915 births
2004 deaths
People from Centerville, Iowa
Military personnel from Iowa
Iowa Wesleyan University alumni
Editors of Iowa newspapers
Republican Party members of the Iowa House of Representatives
20th-century American politicians